Prince Henry's may refer to:
Prince Henry's Grammar School, Otley, a school in Otley, West Yorkshire, England
Prince Henry's High School, a school in Evesham, Worcestershire, England

See also
Prince Henry's Institute of Medical Research, an institute in Melbourne, Australia
Prince Henry (disambiguation)